Darko Mavrak (born 19 January 1969) is a Bosnian former professional footballer who played as a midfielder.

Career
Mavrak began his career with FK Velež Mostar in the Yugoslav First League. He played with FK Proleter Zrenjanin in the 1992–93 First League of FR Yugoslavia. He moved to Swedish sides Djurgårdens IF and IFK Norrköping because of the War in Yugoslavia. He had a brief spell with Panachaiki F.C. in the Greek Super League. Mavrak finished his career with Walsall F.C. in England and Hapoel Tzafririm Holon F.C. in Israel.

References

1969 births
Living people
Sportspeople from Mostar
Association football midfielders
Yugoslav footballers
Bosnia and Herzegovina footballers
FK Velež Mostar players
FK Proleter Zrenjanin players
Djurgårdens IF Fotboll players
IFK Norrköping players
Panachaiki F.C. players
Falkenbergs FF players
Walsall F.C. players
Hapoel Tzafririm Holon F.C. players
Yugoslav First League players
First League of Serbia and Montenegro players
Allsvenskan players
Super League Greece players
English Football League players
Israeli Premier League players
Bosnia and Herzegovina expatriate footballers
Expatriate footballers in Sweden
Bosnia and Herzegovina expatriate sportspeople in Sweden
Expatriate footballers in Greece
Bosnia and Herzegovina expatriate sportspeople in Greece
Expatriate footballers in England
Bosnia and Herzegovina expatriate sportspeople in England
Expatriate footballers in Israel
Bosnia and Herzegovina expatriate sportspeople in Israel